TenneT is a transmission system operator in the Netherlands and in a large part of Germany.

TenneT B.V. is the national electricity transmission system operator of the Netherlands, headquartered in Arnhem. Controlled and owned by the Dutch government, it is responsible for overseeing the operation of the 380 and 220 kV high-voltage grid throughout the Netherlands and its interconnections with neighbouring countries. It is additionally responsible for the 150 kV grid in South Holland.

In Germany, its subsidiary TenneT TSO GmbH is one of the four transmission system operators. Formerly named Transpower, it was taken over and renamed in 2010.

As of 2006, it operates 3,286 km of lines and cables at 150 kV and above, connecting at 51 high-voltage substations. Peak demand for 2006 was 14,846 MW. The sole shareholder is the Dutch Ministry of Finance.

History 

TenneT was formed in 1998 when the Dutch electricity industry was liberalised, and was incorporated as a business in 2001 with the passing of the Electricity Production Sector Transition Act. Its statutory tasks included management of the national transmission grid and maintaining the balance between electrical supply and demand. In 2003, it acquired the regional system operator Transportnet Zuid-Holland.

TenneT moved beyond these regulated businesses in 2004 when it entered the gas market by acquiring EnergieKeuze, an online gas and power contract exchange market.  In 2005 TenneT further expanded its operations when, together with the Belgian and French TSOs Elia and RTE and the APX and Powernext power exchanges, it formed the Belgian Power Exchange Belpex. This granted it a right to participate in the Belgian electricity market.

Since 1 January 2010, Tennet owns the German high‑voltage grid operator Transpower Stromübertragungs GmbH, formerly a part of E.ON, now renamed to Tennet TSO GmbH. The agreed value of transaction was €885 million.  The company quoted several reasons for the merger, including price equalization, improved grid balancing, greater insight into grid situations, and better possibilities for sustainable development in both countries.

On 1 March 2018, the European Commission opened a formal antitrust investigation against TenneT, alleging it was deliberately bottlenecking the grid connection between Denmark and Northern Germany, preventing cheap wind and hydro power from Scandinavia from being exported to the German market. The Commission adopted a decision on 7 December 2018, imposing binding obligations on TenneT to allow at least 75% of the capacity to be utilized after a 6-month implementation period, as well as to expand the connection capacity from 1300MW to 2625MW by January 2026.

TenneT is a partner in European Market Coupling Company.

DC links 
In 2006, TenneT entered into construction of the 700 MW NorNed undersea HVDC submarine power cable with the Norwegian transmission operator Statnett. Commercial operation of the link was delayed by poor weather and a break in the cable, but it eventually entered operation on the night of 6 May 2008. During the first two months of test operations, it generated approximately €50 million in revenue, greatly exceeding estimates, and recovering 12% of its cost of construction.

TenneT has formed a joint venture with the British transmission operator National Grid for a  1,000 MW BritNed DC link between the Isle of Grain, Kent and Maasvlakte, near Rotterdam.  Operation is projected to begin in late 2010. The BritNed interconnection would serve as vital link for the foreseeable European super grid project.

A 700MW submarine power cable called COBRA (like NorNed, also from Eemshaven) to Denmark is operated with Energinet.dk from 2019, signing contracts with Siemens and Prysmian in 2016. Further 3½ GW offshore DC links are intended to provide a sea grid structure, and 6½ GW AC links are planned between Netherlands and Germany.

Its subsidiary Transpower Stromübertragungs together with Statnett operates the 1400MW NORD.LINK cable between Norway and Germany from 2020.

TenneT builds the 2 GigaWatt SuedLink, an onshore DC link between Hamburg and south Germany (near Frankfurt), but local opposition means that a timeline is unclear. Both SuedLink and NORD.LINK are on the EU "Projects of Common Interest" list, and SuedLink is supported by EU with €40 million.

TenneT plans onshore AC upgrades in North Germany, connecting new wind power to some of the above DC links.

Dogger Island 

In 2016, TenneT suggested a 6 km2 artificial island in the Dutch corner of the Dogger Bank in the middle of the North Sea, connecting several GigaWatts of offshore wind farms with alternating current. Converters on the island would then transmit direct current to the countries around the North Sea in a more economic manner than if each wind farm had its own cable to the country building it. TenneT called for feasibility studies in 2017, and signed an agreement with Energinet. The challenge of coordinating several DC links is studied by the Technical University of Denmark using the Kriegers Flak connector as an example.

See also

 50Hertz Transmission
 Amprion
 Elia System Operator

References

External links 
  

Electric power transmission system operators in Germany
Electric power transmission system operators in the Netherlands
Companies established in 1998
Government-owned companies of the Netherlands